Grapevine is a city located in northeast Tarrant County, Texas, United States, with minor portions extending into Dallas County and Denton County. The city is located in the Mid-Cities suburban region between Dallas and Fort Worth and includes a larger portion of Dallas/Fort Worth International Airport than other cities.

The city is adjacent to Grapevine Lake, a large reservoir impounded by the Army Corps of Engineers in 1952 that serves as a source of water and a recreational area.

History

In October 1843, General Sam Houston and fellow Republic of Texas Commissioners camped at Tah-Wah-Karro Creek, also known as Grape Vine Springs, to meet with leaders of 10 Indian nations. This meeting culminated in the signing of a treaty of "peace, friendship, and commerce," which opened the area for homesteaders. The settlement that emerged was named Grape Vine due to its location on the appropriately-named Grape Vine Prairie near Grape Vine Springs, both names in homage to the wild grapes that grew in the area. Grapevine is the oldest settlement in Tarrant County, dating back to 1844 when Texas was a republic before statehood in 1845.

The first recorded white settlement in what would become the modern city occurred in the late 1840s and early 1850s. General Richard Montgomery Gano owned property near Grape Vine and helped organize the early settlement against Comanche raiding parties before leading his band of volunteers to battle in the American Civil War. Growth during the 19th century was slow but steady; by 1890, Grape Vine had about 800 residents supported by such amenities as a newspaper, a public school, several cotton gins, a post office, and railroad service. The settlement made continued gains early in the 20th century and on January 12, 1914, the post office altered the town's name to one word: Grapevine.

On Easter Sunday, April 1, 1934, Henry Methvin, an associate of Bonnie Parker and Clyde Barrow, killed two police officers, E.B. Wheeler, and H.D. Murphy, during an altercation near Grapevine. A historical marker remains at the intersection of Dove Road and State Highway 114.

Grapevine's population fell during the interwar period, as the economy stagnated, though the city was officially incorporated in 1936. Cotton was the primary crop for Grapevine until the early 20th century when it was overtaken by cantaloupe farms that accounted for 25,000 acres. For several decades, until the early 1970s, the Rotary Club sign outside of town boasted Grapevine as the "Cantaloupe Capital of the World". Population growth and economic gains resumed to some extent in the decades after World War II. The opening of Dallas–Fort Worth International Airport in 1974 spurred massive development. Grapevine depended heavily upon agricultural production prior to the mid-20th century but transformed into a regional center of commerce because of its proximity to the airport's north entrance.

In recent years, several wineries have opened in Grapevine, and the city has been active in maintaining its historic downtown corridor.

Geography
Grapevine is located at  (32.935025, −97.085784).

Demographics

2020 United States Census

As of the 2020 United States census, there were 50,631 people, 21,838 households, and 13,887 families residing in the city.

2010 United States Census 
As of the 2010 census, 46,334 people, 18,223 households, and 12,332 families were residing in the city. The population density was 1,451 people per square mile.  The racial makeup of the city was 81.1% White, 3.3% African American, 0.7% Native American, 4.5% Asian, 8.0% from other races, and 2.2% from two or more races. Hispanic or Latino of any race were 18.0% of the population.

Of the 18,223 households,  33.6% had children under the age of 18 living with them, 51.9% were married couples living together, 10.5% had a single householder with no spouse present, and 33.3% were not families. About 27.1% of all households were made up of individuals, and 14.4% had someone living alone who was 65 years of age or older. The average household size was 2.49, and the average family size was 3.06.

The age distribution in the city was  25.1% under 18, 74.9% over the age of 18, 5.6% from 20 to 24, 13.3% from 25 to 34, 24.7% from 35 to 49, 20.9% from 50 to 64, and 7.9% who were 65 or older. The median age was 37.5 years.

Recent estimates 
According to a 2010 estimate, the median household income was $76,040, and the median family income was $93,587. Males had a median income of $66,378 versus $47,995 for females. The per capita income was $38,304. About 5.2% of families and 7.9% of the population were below the poverty line, including 11.3% of those under age 18 and 5.5% of those age 65 or over.

Data provided by the city's Economic Development Department shows a general upward trend in population, with an estimated population of 54,578 as of 2020. The median age in the city was estimated at 36 years old, with more than half of residents obtaining an Associate's Degree or higher. Median household income had also increased to $88,225.

Government

Municipal government

Grapevine uses a council–manager government, consisting of an elected city council, composed of the mayor and six at-large councilmembers, with a city manager appointed by the council.  The current city manager is Bruno Rumbelow.

The government is a voluntary member of the North Central Texas Council of Governments.

Grapevine City Council

Politics 
Grapevine, located in conservative Northeast Tarrant County, has voted  Republican in all elections.

Tarrant County Officials

Texas Legislature 

The city almost entirely lies within the boundaries of Texas House District 98 and Texas Senate Districts 9 and 12, with very small portions lying within Texas House Districts 63 and 115 and Texas Senate Districts 10 and 16.

Texas State Board of Education 

The city almost entirely lies within the boundaries of Texas State Board of Education District 11, with a very small portion lying within District 14.

United States House of Representatives

Education 

The Grapevine-Colleyville Independent School District serves most of the city. The district operates 11 elementary schools (prekindergarten through grade 5), four middle schools (grades 6–8), and two high schools (grades 9–12). Colleyville Heritage High School and Grapevine High School both draw students from different areas of Grapevine.

Northwestern Grapevine lies inside Carroll Independent School District, while smaller portions are served by Lewisville Independent School District and Coppell Independent School District.

The Faith Christian School, a private school, is also in Grapevine.

Economy 

Grapevine's economy is largely centered around travel and tourism, although those sectors also promote strong growth in other areas such as entertainment, retail trade, and transportation. Travelers arriving to and departing from Dallas/Fort Worth International Airport make up the majority of the city's visitors. The Gaylord Texan and Great Wolf Lodge are the two biggest hotels in Grapevine and among the biggest in the Metroplex. The hotels also have large convention centers and entertainment venues. In 2020, Coury Hospitality launched Hotel Vin, a new boutique hotel attached to the recently finished TEXRail station.

Nearby Grapevine Mills Mall is a regional outlet shopping center with many amenities, including a movie theater. Embassy Suites Grapevine and the DFW Lakes Hilton complex also lay adjacent to Grapevine Mills and Bass Pro Shops.

In addition to these areas, Main Street in historic downtown Grapevine is a popular attraction. Public amenities like City Hall, the Grapevine Convention and Visitor's Bureau, the city library, public parks, and a recreation center are located on Main Street, nestled in between a wealth of small businesses. These include antique stores, restaurants, bars, theaters, and many specialty shops. The Grapevine Vintage Railroad follows a historic route between Grapevine and the Fort Worth Stockyards, departing from a station on South Main Street. The city is also the home of several wineries and tasting rooms including Umbra Winery as well as the Texas Wine and Grape Growers Association.

According to the City's 2018 Comprehensive Annual Financial Report, the city's top employers are:

GameStop, a national electronics retailer and one of the city's largest corporate employers, is headquartered in Grapevine.

In April 2017, Kubota Corp. established a new U.S. headquarters in Grapevine, moving about 300 employees from California and spending $50 million.

In 2020, The Trade Group completed construction on their US headquarters near the Northern border of the city.

The facility at 1639 West 23rd Street is on the property of DFW Airport and in Grapevine. Tenants include China Airlines, Lufthansa Cargo, and the U.S. Fish and Wildlife Service.

Historically, Grapevine was the headquarters of a collection of now-defunct air carriers. In 1978 Braniff Place, the final world headquarters for Braniff International Airways, was built in what is now Grapevine, on the grounds of Dallas/Fort Worth International Airport. Following Braniff's 1982 bankruptcy, the structure is now known as Verizon Place. In the 1990s Metro Airlines maintained its main offices in the city of Grapevine, as did Kitty Hawk Aircargo for a time.

Transportation

Highways
Two grade-separated highways run through the city. State Highways 114 and 121 trisect Grapevine south and slightly west of downtown. 121 runs from the south and 114 from the northwest. The highways intersect near Mustang Drive and William D. Tate Avenue and continue together towards the airport before splitting again at the north entrance of Dallas/Fort Worth International Airport. Grapevine's highways 2010 underwent a significant overhaul to improve traffic flow through the area.

Major Roads
  I-635 (Lyndon B. Johnson Freeway)
  SH 26 (Ira E. Woods Avenue)
  SH 114 (Northwest Parkway)
  Bus. SH 114 (Northwest Highway)
  SH 121
  SH 360
  Spur 97 (International Parkway)
  FM 2499

Airports
Dallas/Fort Worth International Airport is the main provider of air service to Grapevine and the region, providing connections to places around the state, country, and abroad. DFW is the main hub for American Airlines, though other major carriers maintain a large presence. Love Field in Dallas is relatively close to Grapevine.

Rail
The Grapevine Vintage Railroad provides service to and from Fort Worth along the former Cotton Belt Railroad right-of-way. The service acts more as a tourist attraction due to its slow speeds. However, the city's 50-year commitment to the Trinity Metro and approval of a half-cent sales tax increase have paid dividends through the introduction of the TEXRail service to northeast Tarrant County since January 10, 2019. New train stations downtown and north of the airport are included in the plans, as is a connection to Dallas Area Rapid Transit (DART) light rail provides mass transit service to the eastern half of the Dallas–Fort Worth metroplex.

The closest connections to rail are the DFW airport, Terminal A, DART Rail station, and the Hurst station for the Trinity Rail Express. Amtrak passenger service is available in both downtown Dallas and Fort Worth.

Bus
The Convention and Visitor's Bureau operates the Grapevine Visitor's Shuttle between points of interest within the city. Additional information including stops and pricing can be found here.

Bicycle

The majority of Grapevine's transportation infrastructure is centered around the automobile, though amenities for bicycles can be found. A bicycle route runs along the length of Dove Road beginning at the intersection of Dove and North Main Street, connecting Grapevine and Southlake.

Additionally, the Cotton Belt trail runs parallel to State Highway 26, from the Colleyville city limits to downtown Grapevine. The "Dallas Road" project will stretch over 1.5 miles to extend the Cotton Belt Trail with a 10-foot wide trail section along the north side of western Dallas road between William D Tate Avenue, Ball Street, and Dooley Street. A 10-foot-wide trail will also be added along the east side of Dooley north from Dallas Road to the Dallas Area Rapid Transit right of way. A 12-foot-trail section will be added east from Dooley along the north side of the DART rail corridor to Texan Trail. This will provide a very wide cement trail from Colleyville to the far east side of Grapevine.

Other bicycle paths can be found at the various city parks, most notably the trail from Parr Park to Bear Creek Park. Off-road trails are also available. The Northshore Mountain Bike trail begins at Rockledge Park on the north side of Grapevine Lake and continues into Flower Mound along the shore. Mileage is 22.5 miles broken up into two major loops: East Loops, 1 – 4, which are 12.5 miles, and the West Loops, 5 – 7.  Horseshoe Trail begins at Catfish Lane, continues to Dove Road, and loops back to the trailhead, for a total of 5.4 miles.

Running
Grapevine received the Runner Friendly Community designation from the Road Runners Club of America. Grapevine has approximately 24 miles of hike and bike trails that link parks, schools, and businesses. The hike and bike trails have mileage markers that also have GPS coordinates for location identification in case of emergencies. The city also has an indoor 1/8 mile walking/jogging track and several outdoor tracks that belong to the local school district. The city has a joint-use agreement with the school district for the use of school facilities.

The hike and bike trails in Grapevine include water fountains, community bathrooms or portable toilets, available parking, signs linking pedestrian networks, mile markers, walk lights at busy intersections, stop signs at residential intersections, and painted crosswalks. One trail in Grapevine links with four other communities, creating an additional 11-mile trail.

Media 
Grapevine is mentioned in the National Geographic Channel special, The Real Bonnie and Clyde. The historical marker (at Dove Road and Highway 114) where Bonnie, Clyde, and Henry Methvin shot two Texas state troopers is shown.
An episode of true crime show Snapped is set in Grapevine.
Some scenes from the film Tender Mercies are also set in Grapevine.
Miracle Dogs Too was filmed in Grapevine in 2006.
Portions of RoboCop were filmed at B&D Mills.
The Nat Geo Wild Series, "Dr. T, Lone Star Vet" is filmed at Texas Avian & Exotic Animal Hospital in Grapevine.

Notable people

 Jaimie Alexander, actress, born in Greenville, South Carolina, lived in Grapevine from age 4 to age 18
 Zach Bolton, voice actor and ADR director affiliated with Funimation
 Joe Bob Briggs, film critic
 Reggie Cannon, professional soccer player with FC Dallas, Boavista
 Jenna Dewan, actress
 Wally Funk, aviator, space tourist, and Goodwill Ambassador
 Chip Gaines, TV personality
 Greg Garza, a professional soccer player with FC Cincinnati
 Mckenna Grace, actress
 Annie Ilonzeh, actress
 Norah Jones, singer-songwriter and actress, born in Brooklyn, New York, lived in Grapevine
 Nick Leckey, NFL center for the New Orleans Saints, St. Louis Rams, and the Arizona Cardinals
 Demi Lovato, singer/songwriter
 Post Malone, rapper and singer-songwriter
 George McFarland, actor, Spanky of Our Gang/The Little Rascals
 Jaret Reddick, lead singer of Bowling for Soup
 Shea Salinas, professional soccer player with San Jose Earthquakes

Places
 Dallas/Fort Worth International Airport
 Fellowship Church
 Gaylord Texan
 Grapevine Mills Mall
 Lake Grapevine
 Great Wolf Lodge Grapevine
 Historic Downtown
 9/11 Flight Crew Memorial
B & D Mills

Gallery

Sister cities

  Krems an der Donau, Austria (since 1999)
  Parras de la Fuente, Mexico (since 1996)
  Linlithgow, West Lothian, Scotland (since 2008)

Notes

External links

 City of Grapevine Official Website
 Grapevine Convention & Visitors Bureau
 Brief history of Grapevine

 
Dallas–Fort Worth metroplex
Cities in Tarrant County, Texas
Cities in Texas
Cities in Denton County, Texas
Cities in Dallas County, Texas
Populated places established in 1914
1914 establishments in Texas